A list of statues of George Washington, an American Founding Father, commanding general of the Continental Army during the American Revolutionary War, and the first U.S. president.

See also
 Mount Rushmore
 List of memorials to George Washington
 List of sculptures of presidents of the United States
 Presidential memorials in the United States

References

Washington, George